Tapfumaneyi Jonga (born 13 November 1959) is a Zimbabwean long-distance runner. He competed in the marathon at the 1980 Summer Olympics.

References

1959 births
Living people
Athletes (track and field) at the 1980 Summer Olympics
Athletes (track and field) at the 1984 Summer Olympics
Zimbabwean male long-distance runners
Zimbabwean male marathon runners
Olympic athletes of Zimbabwe
Athletes (track and field) at the 1982 Commonwealth Games
Commonwealth Games competitors for Zimbabwe
Place of birth missing (living people)